Hyundai is a South Korean industrial conglomerate ("chaebol"), which was restructured into the following groups:

 Hyundai Group, parts of the former conglomerate which have not been divested
 Hyundai Asan, a real estate construction and civil engineering company
 Hyundai Motor Group, the automotive part of the former conglomerate
 Hyundai Motor Company, an automobile manufacturer
 Hyundai N
 Hyundai Motor India
 Hyundai Mobis, Korean car parts company
 Hyundai Motorsport, a racing team
 Hyundai Rotem, a manufacturer of railway vehicles, defense systems, and factory equipment
 Hyundai Engineering & Construction, a construction company
 Hyundai Heavy Industries Group, the heavy industry part of the former conglomerate
 Hyundai Heavy Industries, the primary company representing the group
 Hyundai Mipo Dockyard, a shipbuilding company
 Hyundai Samho Heavy Industries, a shipbuilding company
 Hyundai Oilbank, a petroleum refinery company
 Hyundai Department Store Group, the retail division of the former conglomerate
 Hyundai Department Store, a department store chain
 Hyundai Development Company Group or HDC Group, a diversified part of the former conglomerate
 Hyundai Development Company, a construction and civil engineering company
 Hyundai EP, a manufacturer of petrochemicals and plastics
 Hyundai Fomex, a professional lighting manufacturer
 Hyundai Marine & Fire Insurance, an insurance company
 Hyundai Corporation, a trading and industrial investment company
 Hyundai Electronics, a chip manufacturer, spun off as Hynix in 2001 and renamed SK Hynix in 2012

See also